Urma is a rural locality (a selo) in Levashinsky District, Republic of Dagestan, Russia. The population was 3,863 as of 2010. There are 101 streets.

Geography 
Urma is located 14 km northwest of Levashi (the district's administrative centre) by road, on the Gerga River. Dzhangamakhi and Kulemtsa are the nearest rural localities.

Nationalities 
Avars live there.

References 

Rural localities in Levashinsky District